Abiola Grant (born 17 November 2002) is a Barbadian footballer who plays as a midfielder for NK Solin of Croatia's First League.

Club career
Grant began playing football at age 5. He came up through the ranks of Pro Shottas Football Club and won the Barbados Cup with the team. Domestically, Grant began his senior career with Empire Club of the Barbados Premier League in 2017 while he was still a student at the Christ Church Foundation School. 

In 2018 he attended a week-long camp with Boca Juniors in Argentina. In April 2019 he went on trial with FC DAC 1904 Dunajská Streda of the Slovak Super Liga. He was set to return to Europe for more trials in November 2020 but could not because of the ongoing COVID-19 pandemic.

In February 2021, Grant went on a two-week trial with Kazincbarcikai SC of the Hungarian Nemzeti Bajnokság II. The following month it was announced that he had signed for the club for the remainder of the 2020–21 season. He made his debut for the club in a friendly with DVTK on 26 March 2021. Following the season, Kazincbarcikai was relegated to the Nemzeti Bajnokság III and Grant left the club. Following a series of trials and offers from other clubs in Hungary, he joined FK Radnički Sremska Mitrovica of the Serbian First League, the second tier of football in Serbia, on transfer deadline day in late August 2021.

In January 2022 Grant joined Brežice 1919 of the Slovenian Second League and appeared in a training match against NK Rudar Velenje. He made his league debut for the club as a late substitute against NK Dob on 10 April 2022. His contract was later extended to 30 May 2023.

In January 2023 Grant moved to NK Solin of Croatia's First League on a professional contract for the remainder of the 2022–23 season.

International career
Grant has represented Barbados at the U15, U17, and U20 levels. He made two appearances for the under-17 team in the 2019 CONCACAF U-17 Championship. By March 2021 he had scored seven total youth international goals for his country.

References

External links
 
 NZS profile
 

Living people
2002 births
Barbadian footballers
Barbados under-20 international footballers
Barbados youth international footballers
Association football forwards
Sportspeople from Bridgetown